In mathematics, the fiber bundle construction theorem is a theorem which constructs a fiber bundle from a given base space, fiber and a suitable set of transition functions. The theorem also gives conditions under which two such bundles are isomorphic. The theorem is important in the associated bundle construction where one starts with a given bundle and surgically replaces the fiber with a new space while keeping all other data the same.

Formal statement

Let X and F be topological spaces and let G be a topological group with a continuous left action on F. Given an open cover {Ui} of X and a set of continuous functions

defined on each nonempty overlap, such that the cocycle condition

holds, there exists a fiber bundle E → X with fiber F and structure group G that is trivializable over {Ui} with transition functions tij.

Let E′ be another fiber bundle with the same base space, fiber, structure group, and trivializing neighborhoods, but transition functions t′ij. If the action of G on F is faithful, then E′ and E are isomorphic if and only if there exist functions

such that

Taking ti to be constant functions to the identity in G, we see that two fiber bundles with the same base, fiber, structure group, trivializing neighborhoods, and transition functions are isomorphic.

A similar theorem holds in the smooth category, where X and Y are smooth manifolds, G is a Lie group with a smooth left action on Y and the maps tij are all smooth.

Construction

The proof of the theorem is constructive. That is, it actually constructs a fiber bundle with the given properties. One starts by taking the disjoint union of the product spaces Ui × F

and then forms the quotient by the equivalence relation

The total space E of the bundle is T/~ and the projection π : E → X is the map which sends the equivalence class of (i, x, y) to x. The local trivializations

are then defined by

Associated bundle

Let E → X a fiber bundle with fiber F and structure group G, and let F′ be another left G-space. One can form an associated bundle E′ → X with a fiber F′ and structure group G by taking any local trivialization of E and replacing F by F′ in the construction theorem. If one takes F′ to be G with the action of left multiplication then one obtains the associated principal bundle.

References

 See Part I, §2.10 and §3.

Fiber bundles
Theorems in topology